Banksia subpinnatifida is a species of bushy shrub that is endemic to the southwest of Western Australia. It has more or less linear, pinnatipartite leaves with sharply-pointed teeth on the sides, golden yellow flowers in heads of about sixty, and glabrous, elliptical follicles.

Description
Banksia subpinnatifida is a bushy shrub that typically grows to a height of  but does not form a lignotuber. There are up to fifteen widely spaced teeth in the lower half of the leaf. The flowers are golden yellow and arranged in heads of between sixty and seventy, the heads often crowded on short side branches.

Taxonomy
This species was first formally described in 1964 by Charles Austin Gardner who gave it the name Dryandra subpinnatifida and published the description in the Journal of the Royal Society of Western Australia from specimens collected by Fred Lullfitz.

In 1996, Alex George describe two varieties of Dryandra subpinnatifida in the journal Nuytsia:

In 2007, Austin Mast and Kevin Thiele transferred all the dryandras to the genus Banksia and this species became Banksia subpinnatifida and the varieties var. inerbis and subpinnatifida respectively.

Distribution and habitat
Banksia subpinnatifida is found between Pingelly and Tambellup. Variety inerbis occurs between Boddington and Broomehill, and var. subpinnatifida grows in thick scrub between Pingelly and Narrogin.

Conservation status
Banksia subpinnatifida is classified as "not threatened" by the Western Australian Government Department of Parks and Wildlife but var. inerbis is listed as "Priority Three" meaning that it is poorly known and known from only a few locations but is not under imminent threat and var. subpinnatifida as "Priority Two" meaning that it is poorly known and from only one or a few locations.

References

subpinnatifida
Flora of Western Australia
Plants described in 1964
Taxa named by Charles Gardner